François Marie Algoud (July 1, 1920 – January 5, 2012) was a French royalist and Roman Catholic author, who was affiliated with Action Française.

Publications

 Guide jeunesse : 1000 mouvements, associations, organismes, centres, foyers, communautés, écoles
 Mille six-cents jeunes saints, jeunes témoins : de leur foi, de leur idéal, de toujours et de maintenant
 with Michel Berger, Culture de vie contre culture de mort ou La foi, l'Église et le bon sens
 with Désiré Dutonnerre, La peste et le choléra : Marx, Hitler et leurs héritiers
 Editor, Berthe Hansenne, Lettre aux catholiques français : il faut reconstruire le temple de Dieu
 France, notre seule patrie : mises au point, preface by Pierre Pujo
 Actualité et présence de Charles Maurras (1868-1952), volume I, Un très grand poète, la musique des vers au service de l'ordre, du beau et du vrai
 Actualité et présence de Charles Maurras (1868-1952), t. II, L'altissime au service de la France et de l'Église, préface by Jean-Marie Keller ; contributions from Albert André Algoud, Michel Fromentoux and François Saint-Pierre

References

1920 births
2012 deaths
People affiliated with Action Française
French political writers
French Navy personnel of World War II
French male non-fiction writers